Princess Norberta of Liechtenstein, Marquesa de Mariño ( Norberta Elisabeth Maria Assunta Josefine Georgine et omnes sancti; 31 October 1950), popularly known as Princess Nora, is a member of 
Liechtenstein princely family. She is the fourth child and only daughter of Franz Joseph II, Prince of Liechtenstein and his wife Georgina von Wilczek, and the younger sister of Hans-Adam II, Prince of Liechtenstein.

Education and career
Princess Nora studied at the University of Geneva and the Graduate Institute of International and Development Studies, also in Geneva. She has worked for the World Bank and the International Institute for Environment and Development, among others. She speaks French, English, German and Spanish.

She has been a member of the International Olympic Committee since 1984. She was president of Liechtenstein's National Olympic Committee from 1982 to 1992 and she has been president of Special Olympics Liechtenstein since 2002.

She was Chief Scouting Guide of Liechtensteinische Pfadfinderinnenkorps Santa Maria from 1973 to 1989. Today she is Honorary member of the Scout association.

Family
On 11 June 1988, she married Don Vicente Sartorius y Cabeza de Vaca, Marqués de Mariño (Madrid, 30 November 1931 – Ibiza, 22 July 2002), at St. Florin's in Vaduz. Together they had one daughter:
Doña María Teresa Sartorius y de Liechtenstein (born 21 November 1992).

She is the godmother of Princess Laetitia Maria of Belgium, Archduchess of Austria-Este, the third daughter of Princess Astrid of Belgium.

Honours

National honours 
  Liechtenstein : Commemorative Medal on the Occasion of the 70th Birthday of His Serene Highness Prince Franz Joseph II (16/08/1976).

See also
 Princely Family of Liechtenstein

References

External links
 Biography of HSH the Princess Nora of Liechtenstein - official website of the Olympic movement
 Special Olympics Liechtenstein

1950 births
Living people
Liechtenstein princesses
International Olympic Committee members
Nora of Liechtenstein,Princess
Liechtenstein Roman Catholics
Nora of Liechtenstein,Princess
Graduate Institute of International and Development Studies alumni
20th-century Liechtenstein women
21st-century Liechtenstein women
Liechtenstein expatriates in Switzerland
Daughters of monarchs